David Langer (born 27 January 1976) is a retired Czech football midfielder.

References

1976 births
Living people
Czech footballers
MFK Vítkovice players
FC Slovan Liberec players
FK Mladá Boleslav players
Panionios F.C. players
Association football midfielders
Czech expatriate footballers
Expatriate footballers in Greece
Czech expatriate sportspeople in Greece
Czech First League players
Super League Greece players
People from Rýmařov
Sportspeople from the Moravian-Silesian Region